The 2000 Asian Men's Junior Handball Championship (7th tournament) took place in Mashhad from 30 August–8 September. It acts as the Asian qualifying tournament for the 2001 Men's Junior World Handball Championship.

Draw

Preliminary round

Group A

Group B

Placement 5th–10th

9th/10th

7th/8th

5th/6th

Final round

Semifinals

Bronze medal match

Gold medal match

Final standing

References
www.handball.jp (Archived 2009-09-04)

H
H
Asia
Asian Handball Championships